Sweet soy sauce is a sweetened aromatic soy sauce, originating in Indonesia, which has a darker color, a viscous syrupy consistency and a molasses-like flavor due to the generous addition of palm sugar or jaggery. Kecap manis is widely used with satay. It is similar to, though finer in flavor than, Chinese Tianmian sauce (tianmianjiang). It is by far the most popular type of soy sauce employed in Indonesian cuisine, and accounts for an estimated 90 percent of the nation's total soy sauce production.

Ingredients
Compared to kecap asin, the mildly salty regular soy sauce, the sweet soy sauce has a slightly thicker consistency, and tastes much sweeter. This condiment is made from a fermented paste of boiled black soybeans, roasted grain, salt, water and Aspergillus wentii mold, to which palm sugar is added. The strong sweet taste is contributed by a generous amount of palm sugar — the sauce may contain up to 50 percent gula merah or gula jawa (palm sugar jaggery). Indonesian sweet soy sauce is often enriched with spices, including star anise, cinnamon, black pepper, coriander and clove.

Uses
Kecap manis is an essential sauce in the Indonesian pantry. It is used to add a pleasantly mild sweet and umami flavor in most popular Indonesian dishes, including nasi goreng, mie goreng, kwetiau goreng, ayam kecap (roasted chicken), babi kecap (braised pork), semur beef stew, and ketoprak. It is also a popular marinade for grilled dishes, such as satay, ayam bakar (grilled chicken) and ikan bakar (grilled fish). Sweet soy sauce is also a popular dipping sauce, mixed with chopped shallot and bird's eye chili and served as dipping sauce for tahu goreng (fried tofu). Steamed rice topped with fried egg and drizzled with sweet soy sauce is a popular meal among Indonesians in the 1990s and 2000s, especially children. In Eastern Indonesia, sweet soy sauce is used as the ingredient of colo-colo dipping sauce, although traditionally this Maluku sauce uses black-colored  rendered coconut oil residue.

Brands

In Indonesia there are large numbers of sweet soy sauce brands. Kecap manis is traditionally a small-scale home industry. However there are a handful of brands that are widely distributed throughout Indonesia and regionally, such as kecap manis ABC, Indofood and Sedaap.
Besides the national brands, there are numerous regional brands, such as Ikan Lele in Pati, Mirama in Semarang, Orang Jual Sate in Probolinggo, Siong Hin (SH) in Tangerang, Tomat Lombok in Tegal, etc. More or less, there are a hundred regional brands of kecap manis.
There are also brands that distribute widely in the Netherlands like Conimex, Inproba, Kaki Tiga, and "A" Trade Mark.

Substitutes
Sweet soy sauce is widely available in Indonesian marketplaces, warungs, minimarkets, supermarkets, toko and Asian grocery stores worldwide. However, it is quite hard to find in most parts of Europe (except for the Netherlands, UK and Germany) and also quite scarce in the Americas. Sweet soy sauce can be made from regular soy sauce. Regular soy sauce mixed with brown sugar, added with a trace of molasses, can serve as a substitute for sweet soy sauce.

See also

 Dark soy sauce
 Soup soy sauce
 List of condiments
 List of fermented soy products
 List of sauces
 Sweet bean sauce
 Teriyaki sauce
 Ketchup

References

External links
 Ketjap Manis recipe

Soy sauces
Indonesian condiments
Malaysian condiments